Liverpool Road Halt railway station was a railway station located in the north of Newcastle-under-Lyme, Staffordshire, England. It was opened in 1905 by the North Staffordshire Railway in connection with the introduction of railmotor services.

The station had two short wooden platforms and was accessed via steps leading down from an overbridge on Liverpool Road, which now forms part of the A34.

Unlike most of the other halts on the line it survived until the withdrawal of passenger services in 1964. Although the platforms are long gone the trackbed can still be followed.

Present day

The site of the halt now occupied by a pedestrian underpass.

References

Further reading

Disused railway stations in Staffordshire
Railway stations in Great Britain closed in 1964
Railway stations in Great Britain opened in 1905
Newcastle-under-Lyme
Beeching closures in England
Former North Staffordshire Railway stations